The bailiff is the chief justice in each of the Channel Island bailiwicks of Guernsey and Jersey, also serving as president of the legislature and having ceremonial and executive functions. Each bailiwick has possessed its own bailiff since the islands were divided into two jurisdictions in the 13th century. The bailiffs and deputy bailiffs are appointed by the Crown on the advice of the Secretary of State for Justice (not by the governments or legislatures of the islands) and may hold office until retirement age (65 in Guernsey, 70 in Jersey).

Roles of the bailiffs 
Originally, the bailiff was both legislator and judge, but the position has become increasingly concentrated on the judicial functions. The bailiff presides in the main trial court in his island – the Royal Court of Jersey and the Royal Court of Guernsey, where they sit with Jurats, elected lay judges responsible for making finds of fact. The bailiff of each island is also a member of the court of appeal in his island, and that of the other.
 
The bailiffs are the presidents (presiding officers) of the legislatures—the States of Jersey Assembly and the States of Deliberation in Guernsey.

Constitutional changes introduced in Jersey (2005) and Guernsey (2004) created posts of chief minister and in Jersey (but not in Guernsey) created a ministerial system of government. This has altered the executive functions of the bailiffs but they continue to have a residual executive role (for example, they see any correspondence between the chief minister of their island and the UK government and may be involved in any political decisions affecting the constitutional relationship between the islands and the United Kingdom). Each bailiff continues to be the 'first citizen' of the island, carrying out civil and ceremonial roles.

By constitutional convention he or she (though to date there have been no women holders of the office) and the deputy bailiff are invariably selected from among those who have previously held the senior office within the Law Officers of the Crown–the Procureur in Guernsey and the Attorney General in Jersey. Bailiffs and deputy bailiffs in modern times have also invariably been qualified as advocates in their respective islands.

A deputy bailiff in each bailiwick may preside in the Royal Court and States chamber when the bailiff is not available. Senior jurats may be appointed as lieutenant-bailiffs to perform some ceremonial duties in lieu of the bailiff on occasion as well as presiding over judicial proceedings generally of an administrative nature.

In 1617 a Privy Council decision clarified the division of civil and military responsibilities between the bailiffs and the lieutenant governors in Guernsey and Jersey. For the first time, the Crown laid down the bailiff's precedence over the governor in judicial affairs and in the States chamber.

Bailiff of Guernsey

The Bailiff of Guernsey was less clearly delineated as to separation of legislative or administrative and judicial functions than that of the Bailiff of Jersey. He was head of the administration in Guernsey and used to preside over a number of States committees.

In 2000, the European Court of Human Rights held in McGonnell v. United Kingdom that there was a breach of Article 6 in Guernsey where the Bailiff or Deputy Bailiff sat as president of the States of Guernsey when proposed legislation was being debated and then subsequently sat as a judge of the Royal Court of Guernsey in a case where that legislation was relevant. The court, noting that there was no suggestion that the Bailiff 'was subjectively biased', stated that the 'mere fact' that this happened was capable of casting doubt on the Bailiff's impartiality.

The Bailiff remains civil head of the island, as well as head of the judiciary, the Presiding Officer of the States of Deliberation'.

Bailiff of Jersey

The Bailiff of Jersey is the chief justice of the island and the presiding officer of the States Assembly.

The position of bailiff was created shortly after the Treaty of Paris 1259 in which the King of England, Henry III, gave up claim to all of the Duchy of Normandy but the Channel Islands. Rather than absorb the islands into the Kingdom of England, a warden (now lieutenant governor) and bailiff were appointed to run the island on his behalf.

Historical development
The origin of the States of Jersey lies in the summoning of representatives of the parishes (the connétable and rectors) to advise the Royal Court on legislation. The States of Jersey thus evolved a separate identity. Although it was already sitting in the 16th century, the first separate minutes of the meetings were not kept until the 17th century.

The Royal Court, under the presidency of the bailiff, originally not only administered the law of the island but also wrote it. As a Crown appointment, the bailiff was a powerful figure and the post was the subject of patronage. From the time of George Carteret in the 1660s onwards the position of bailiff became a political fiefdom of the de Carteret family and the position was de facto hereditary – although many of the de Carteret bailiffs, such as the Earl Granville, preferred to pursue political careers in England. During this period, the absentee bailiffs appointed lieutenant-bailiffs to exercise office.

In 1750 Charles Lemprière was appointed lieutenant-bailiff and set about establishing a powerbase by engineering the election and appointments of members of the Lemprière family to office. A succession of weak lieutenant-governors enabled Lemprière to establish an autocratic régime, making the States subservient to the Royal Court and ensuring, by the handpicked appointment of advocates, that opponents would be unable to get legal representation. A threatened shortage of corn sparked popular protest and led to a mob sacking the Royal Court. The bailiff and jurats took refuge in Elizabeth Castle and petitioned the king. In 1770 Colonel Bentinck, a Dutchman, was appointed lieutenant-governor with instructions to oversee reform.

In 1771 it was laid down in Jersey that no laws might be adopted without being passed by the States of Jersey. From this time on the bailiff was to be the chief power in Jersey as president of the States, rather than as president of the Royal Court. The party of Charlots (conservative supporters of Lemprière who claimed that the States could not pass legislation without the agreement of the Royal Court) were opposed at elections by Magots, and by 1790 the progressive Magots had majorities in both the Royal Court and the States.

In 1826, the long succession of absentee bailiffs came to an end with the appointment of Thomas Le Breton. Under Jean Hammond (bailiff 1858-1880) the role became established as a politically impartial, if paternalistic, presidency. The introduction of deputies into the States in 1857 added to the democratic weight of the legislative assembly, but the bailiff still guided the government of the bailiwick.

The States continued to use the Royal Court as their debating chamber until the construction of a dedicated States chamber on an adjacent site in 1887.

The process of democratisation through the 19th and 20th centuries shifted the focus of political influence to the elected members of the States.

In 1921, the property and financial powers of the Assembly of Governor, Bailiff and Jurats was taken over by the States of Jersey, leaving that assembly with only power to act as licensing bench. With the power to levy impôts henceforth in the hands of the States, and with the introduction of the Income Tax law of 1928, the legislators now controlled the budget independently of the bailiff.

Alexander Coutanche, appointed in 1935, was the last bailiff appointed before the passage of a law on the bailiff in 1936. He was the last bailiff appointed for life and the last under the sole prerogative of the Crown without the obligation to consult the States of Jersey.

Although the need for centralised administration during the German Occupation 1940-1945 made the bailiff a commanding figure in the circumstances of trying to maintain the life of the bailiwick, the constitutional reforms of 1948 which removed the jurats from the States, replacing them with senators, separated more clearly legislature and judiciary. Political leadership now rested more clearly with the senators as purely political senior elected representatives.

In 1958 the post of deputy bailiff was introduced to spread the workload of bailiff – the deputy bailiff generally proceeding to replace the bailiff on the latter's retirement or death. Commissions of the Royal Court (acting judges) now ensures that the bailiff never sits on a case which relied on a law that he had taken part in the legislative process for.

The States of Jersey Law 2005 removed the bailiff's casting vote in the event of a tied vote in the States chamber. The 2005 law also introduced a ministerial system of government under a chief minister, which further removed the bailiff from involvement in executive decision-making.

Current roles
The modern-day roles of the bailiff are as follows:
 Head of the judiciary of Jersey
 President of the Royal Court (chief justice) 
 President of the Court of Appeal, though in practice the bailiff rarely sits in this court
 Member of the Court of Appeal of Guernsey
 President of the States Assembly (presiding officer)
 Deputy governor in the absence of the lieutenant governor
 President of the College of Electors under the Royal Court (Jersey) Law 1948 for the election of jurats (existing jurats, senators, deputies, connétables and all practising advocates and solicitors); the bailiff is a member, but may only vote in the event of a tie after a second ballot
 An attendee of the Emergencies Council
 President of the Assembly of Bailiff, Governor and Jurats, inter alia responsible for regulating the sale of alcohol. 
 Responsibility for giving permission for certain types of public entertainment, including theatre, cinema and cabaret performances.  Since 1987, an advisory panel appointed by the States Assembly has delegated authority in the name of the bailiff who is not involved in any respect with the decision-making process. 
 The bailiff has the power to make various judiciary-related appointments:
 Lieutenant bailiffs (usually jurats) and commissioners, any of whom may preside over the Royal Court and exercise other judicial functions of the bailiff as required.
 the magistrate, assistant magistrate and relief magistrates.
 approves the appointment by the Attorney General of Crown Advocates.
 appoints the Viscount.
 The bailiff is the civic head of the island, carrying out various ceremonial duties (such as on Liberation Day and Remembrance Sunday) and receiving distinguished visitors to Jersey.
 The bailiff has a role as ‘guardian of the constitution’. Outgoing official correspondence to the Ministry of Justice (the UK government department responsible for relations with the island) goes from the bailiff via the lieutenant governor, with input from the attorney general. Incoming correspondence takes the reverse route. The substance of the correspondence is settled by the political decision of the chief minister who is responsible for the island's external relations.

The deputy bailiff has a specific function of being the President of the Board of Examiners for the  Jersey law examinations.

Proposed reforms
The question whether the office of bailiff should combine roles of chief justice, presiding officer of the legislature and civic functions has long been a matter of debate. The 1947 Report of the Committee of the Privy Council on the Proposed Reforms in the Channel Islands recommended 'that there should be no alteration in the present functions of the Bailiff'. However, both the Clothier committee and the Carswell review called for reforms. The States of Jersey have not accepted this aspect of the Carswell report. Many prominent islanders do not believe that any change is necessary or desirable.

Notes

References 

 
 Memoirs of Lord Coutanche

See also 
 Bailiff
 Courts of Jersey
 Judge of Alderney
 Law of Jersey
 List of Bailiffs of Guernsey
 List of Bailiffs of Jersey
 States of Guernsey
 States of Jersey

Government of Guernsey
Government of Jersey
Chairs of subnational legislatures
Chief justices
Judiciary of Jersey